Amphisphaeria is a genus of fungi in the family Amphisphaeriaceae.

References

External links
Index Fungorum

Xylariales
Taxa named by Vincenzo de Cesati
Taxa named by Giuseppe De Notaris